The military history of Canada during World War I 
began on August 4, 1914, when the United Kingdom entered the First World War (1914–1918) by declaring war on Germany. The British declaration of war automatically brought Canada into the war, because of Canada's legal status as a British Dominion which left foreign policy decisions in the hands of the British parliament. However, the Canadian government had the freedom to determine the country's level of involvement in the war. On August 4, 1914, the Governor General declared a war between Canada and Germany. The Militia was not mobilized and instead an independent Canadian Expeditionary Force was raised.

Canada's sacrifices and contributions to the Great War changed its history and enabled it to become more independent, while also opening a deep rift between the French and English speaking populations. For the first time in Canadian military history, Canadian forces fought as a distinct unit, first under a British commander but ultimately under a Canadian-born commander. The highpoints of Canadian military achievement during the Great War came during the Somme, Vimy, and Passchendaele battles and what later became known as "Canada's Hundred Days". Canada's total casualties stood at the end of the war at 67,000 killed and 173,000 wounded, out of an expeditionary force of 620,000 people mobilized (39 per cent of mobilized were casualties).

Canadians of British descent—the majority—gave widespread support arguing that Canadians had a duty to fight on behalf of their Motherland. Indeed, Sir Wilfrid Laurier, although French-Canadian,  spoke for the majority of English-Canadians when he proclaimed: "It is our duty to let Great Britain know and to let the friends and foes of Great Britain know that there is in Canada but one mind and one heart and that all Canadians are behind the Mother Country." However this did not stop Laurier along with Henri Bourassa from leading the opposition to conscription three years later in 1917. Canadian Prime Minister Robert Borden offered assistance to Great Britain, which was quickly accepted.

Beginning

Preparations 
Prior to the war, military land forces were organized as the Canadian Militia, with the regular Permanent Active Militia, and the sedentary Non-Permanent Active Militia. The Minister of Militia and Defence, Sam Hughes, was ordered by Prime Minister Sir Robert Borden to train and recruit an army for overseas service. At the time, Canada had a regular army of only 3,110 men and a fledgling navy.

Although the Chief of the General Staff, Willoughby Gwatkin, had been planning for a mass mobilization of Canadian Militia for some time, the mobilization plans were scrapped in favour of mobilizing a completely new land force, the Canadian Expeditionary Force, to be based on numbered battalions and reporting to a separate ministry, the Ministry of Overseas Forces of Canada. Although the force was raised quickly, it was riven with political patronage and lacked a solid core of professional officers and NCOs.

Participation 

600,000 men and women participated in the war by enlisting as nurses, soldiers and chaplains. In general, non-white people and those born in enemy nations were not welcomed into the military. When Black people from Sydney, Nova Scotia volunteered their services, they were told, "This is not for you fellows, this is a white man's war." Nonetheless, some segregated units were formed. In 1915, Indigenous people were allowed to enlist and accepted into a 114th Battalion as well as others. In total, about 3,500 Indigenous people would serve with the Canadian Forces, but this figure has been disputed. The Canadian Japanese Association in British Columbia put forward a volunteer reserve force of 227 men, some of whom were later admitted into the military. The No. 2 Construction Battalion included black soldiers from both Canada and the United States, the latter having crossed into Canada in order to participate. The over one thousand Black Canadians who served would continue to be segregated during their tour, both on ships and in camps. A deal between the Chinese government and the allies resulted in the enlistment of thousands of Chinese who formed the Chinese Labour Corps (CLC) mainly poor Chinese men from the North who were told they would be in non-combatant roles. The Canadian government had restricted the arrival of all Asians and the CLC were secretly landed in Victoria, British Columbia. They were drilled in the old quarantine station at William Head and secretly shipped across Canada in cattle-trucks.

Field formations

Canadian Corps

The Canadian Corps was formed as a field formation of the Canadian Expeditionary Force in September 1915 after the arrival of the 2nd Canadian Division in France. The soldiers of the corps were mostly volunteers, as conscription was not implemented until the end of the war (see Conscription Crisis of 1917). The corps was expanded by the addition of the 3rd Canadian Division in December 1915 and the 4th Canadian Division in August 1916. The organization of a 5th Canadian Division began in February 1917, but it was still not fully formed when it was broken up in February 1918 and its men used to reinforce the other four divisions. Although the corps was within and under the command of the British Army, there was considerable pressure among Canadian leaders, especially following the Battle of the Somme, for the corps to fight as a single unit rather than spreading the divisions through the whole army.

Originally commanded by Lieutenant General Sir Edwin Alderson until 1916, command was then passed to Lieutenant General Sir Julian Byng, later, Lord Byng of Vimy and Governor General of Canada. When Byng was promoted to a higher command in the summer of 1917, he was succeeded by the commander of the 1st Division, General Sir Arthur Currie, giving the corps its first Canadian commanders. In the later stages of the war, the Canadian Corps was among the most effective and respected of the military formations on the Western Front.

Canadian Cavalry Brigade

The Canadian Cavalry Brigade arrived in France in 1915. Initially having three Canadian regiments and one British, in January 1916, it became an all-Canadian formation. The brigade was deployed separately from the Canadian Corps and was under the command of various British cavalry divisions. The brigade engaged in several battles, notably the Battle of Moreuil Wood 30 April 1918.

Western Front

1915

Neuve Chapelle

The Canadian Expeditionary Force saw their first battle in March 1915 in the French town of Neuve Chapelle. After arriving from Salisbury Plain in England, the Canadian forces were instructed to prevent the Germans from reinforcing the sector of Neuve Chapelle. This would allow the British 1st Army, under General Douglas Haig, to successfully push through German lines and establish a new Allied front line on conquered territory.

Although the British were unable to exploit their advantage due to poor communication, it taught Canadians that artillery bombardment was too light to suppress the enemy trenches; that better artillery observation points were necessary; that reserves were too few to follow up success quickly; and most importantly, that the procedure of transmitting information and sending orders to the advanced troops was slow and difficult, and that the systems of communication were much too vulnerable.

Second Battle of Ypres

In the first week of April 1915 the soldiers of the 1st Canadian Division were moved to reinforce the salient where the British and Allied line pushed into the German line in a concave bend. On 22 April, the Germans sought to eliminate this salient by using poison gas. Following an intensive artillery bombardment, they released 160 tons of chlorine gas from cylinders dug into the forward edge of their trenches into a light northeast wind—the first use of chlorine gas in the war. As thick clouds of yellow-green chlorine drifted over their trenches the French colonial defences crumbled and the troops, completely overcome by this terrible weapon, died or broke and fled, leaving a gaping four-mile hole in the Allied line. The Canadians were the only division that were able to hold the line.

All through the night, the Canadians fought to close this gap. On 24 April, the Germans launched another poison gas attack, this time at the Canadian line. In those 48 hours of battle, the Canadians suffered over 6,000 casualties, one man in every three, of whom more than 2,000 died.

1916

Battle of the Somme

The next area where Canadians fought was at the Battle of the Somme from the latter half of 1916. Initially launched as a campaign to relieve pressure from the beleaguered French forces at the Battle of Verdun, the Allied casualties actually exceeded those at Verdun.

The battle began on 1 July 1916, and among the first troops to leave their trenches were the men of the Royal Newfoundland Regiment. Newfoundland at the time was not a part of the Canadian confederation but was considered a separate dominion; as a result, the Newfoundlanders advanced as part of the 29th Division, not the Canadian Corps. The attack went very poorly for the Newfoundlanders, resulting in massive casualties – of the 801 men that made up the regiment just the day before, only 68 reported for roll call on 2 July, and every officer that had gone over the top had been killed.

The Canadian Corps entered the battle in September when it was tasked to secure the small town of Courcelette, France. In the major offensive which began at dawn on September 15 the Canadian Corps, on the extreme left of the attack, assaulted on a 2,200-yard sector west of the village of Courcelette. By November 11, the 4th Canadian Division finally secured most of the German trenches in Courcelette and then rejoined the Canadian Corps at Vimy Ridge.

The Battle of the Somme claimed more than 24,000 Canadian casualties. But it also gave Canadian units the reputation of a formidable assault force. As British Prime Minister Lloyd George wrote, "The Canadians played a part of such distinction that thenceforward they were marked out as shock troops; for the remainder of the war they were brought along to head the assault in one great battle after another. Whenever the Germans found the Canadian Corps coming into the line they prepared for the worst."

1917

Battle of Vimy Ridge

For the first time, all four Canadian divisions were to be assembled to operate in combat as a corps. The Canadian divisions were joined by the British 5th Infantry Division, and reinforced by artillery, engineer and labour units. The Canadian Corps was supported to the north by the 24th British Division of I Corps which advanced north of the Souchez river and by the advancing XVII Corps to the south. The attack began at 5:43 a.m. on Easter Monday, 9 April 1917 whereupon every artillery piece at the disposal of the Canadian Corps began firing. Light field guns laid down a barrage which advanced in predetermined increments, often  every three minutes, while medium and heavy howitzers established a series of standing barrages further ahead, against known defensive systems.
 
The 1st, 2nd and 3rd Canadian Divisions reported reaching and capturing their first objective, the Black Line, by 6:25 a.m. The 4th Canadian Division encountered a great deal of trouble in its advance and was unable to complete its first objective until some hours later. After a planned pause, in which positions were consolidated, the advance resumed. Shortly after 7:00 a.m., the 1st Canadian Division had taken half of its second objective, the Red Line, and moved a brigade forward to mount an attack on the remainder. The 2nd Canadian Division reported reaching the Red Line and capturing the town of Les Tilleuls at approximately the same time. Units at the 3rd Canadian Division reached their section of the Red Line at around 7:30 a.m. However, due to an exposed left flank caused by the failure of the 4th Canadian Division to capture the top of the ridge, the 3rd Canadian Division was forced to stop and establish a divisional defensive flank to its north. It was not until 11:00 a.m. that the defending German 79th Reserve Division mounted a counterattack, by which time only the 4th Canadian Division had not reached its objective.

Three fresh brigades were moved up to the Red Line by 9:30 a.m., 10 April to support the advance whereupon they leapfrogged existing units occupying the Red line and advanced to the Blue Line. By approximately 11:00 a.m., the Blue Line, including Hill 135 and the town of Thélus, had been captured. The advance briefly halted, the artillery barrage remaining stationary for 90 minutes to give troops time to consolidate the Blue Line and bring supporting machine guns forward. Shortly before 1 p.m., the advance recommenced with the Brown Line being secure around 2:00 p.m. By this point only the northern half of Hill 145 and "the Pimple", a fortified highpoint outside of Givenchy-en-Gohelle, remained under German control. Fresh troops finally forced the remaining German troops from the northern half of Hill 145 at around 3:15 p.m. and by nightfall of 10 April, the only objective not yet achieved was the capture of "the Pimple". Supported by a significant amount of artillery and the 24th British Division of I Corps to the north, the 10th Canadian Brigade attacked the hastily entrenched German troops and captured "the Pimple" on 12 April, bringing an end to the battle. By nightfall on 12 April 1917 the Canadian Corps was in firm control of the ridge.

The corps had suffered 10,602 casualties; 3,598 killed and 7,004 wounded. The German Sixth Army suffered an unknown number of casualties with an approximate 4,000 men becoming prisoners of war. Four Victoria Crosses, the highest military decoration awarded to British and Commonwealth forces for valour, were awarded. The Germans did not attempt to recapture the ridge, even in the Spring Offensive, and it remained under British control until the end of the war.

Battle of Passchendaele

The four divisions of the Canadian Corps were transferred to the Ypres Salient and tasked with making additional advances on Passchendaele. The Canadian Corps relieved II Anzac Corps on 18 October from their positions along the valley between Gravenstafel Ridge and the heights at Passchendaele. It was virtually the same front as had been occupied by the 1st Canadian Division in April 1915. The Canadian Corps operation was to be executed in series of three attacks each with limited objectives, delivered at intervals of three or more days. As the Canadian Corps position was directly south of the inter-army boundary between British Fifth and Second Army, the British Fifth Army would mount subsidiary operations on the Canadian Corps' left flank while the I Anzac Corps would advance to protect the right flank. The execution dates of the phases were tentatively given as 26 October, 30 October and 6 November.

The first stage began on the morning of 26 October. The 3rd Canadian Division was assigned the northern flank which included the sharply rising ground of the Bellevue spur. South of the Ravebeek creek, the 4th Canadian Division would take the Decline Copse which straddled the Ypres-Roulers railway. The 3rd Canadian Division captured the Wolf Copse and secured its objective line but was ultimately forced to drop a defensive flank to link up with the flanking division of the British Fifth Army. The 4th Canadian Division initially captured all its objectives, but gradually retreated from the Decline Copse due to German counterattacks and mis-communications between the Canadian and Australian units to the south.

The second stage began on 30 October and was intended to capture the positions not captured in the previous stage and gain a base for the final assault on Passchendaele. The southern flank was to capture the strongly held Crest Farm while the northern flank was to capture the hamlet of Meetcheele as well as the Goudberg area near the Canadian Corps' northern boundary. The southern flank quickly captured Crest Farm and begun sending patrols beyond its objective line and into Passchendaele itself. The northern flank was again met with exceptional German resistance. The 3rd Canadian Division captured Vapour Farm at the corps' boundary, Furst Farm to the west of Meetcheele and the crossroads at Meetcheele, but remained short of its objective line.

To permit time to facilitate inter-divisional reliefs, there was a planned seven-day pause between the second and third stage. British Second Army was ordered to take over section of the British Fifth Army front adjoining the Canadian Corps, so that the central portion of the assault could proceed under a single command. Three consecutive rainless days between 3 and 5 November aided logistical preparations and reorganization of the troops for the next stage. The third stage began the morning of 6 November with the 1st and 2nd Canadian Divisions having taken over the front, relieving the 3rd and 4th Canadian Divisions respectively. Less than three hours after the start of the assault, many units had reached their final objective lines and the town of Passchendaele had been captured.

A final successful action to gain the remaining high ground north of the village in the vicinity of Hill 52 was launched 11 November. This attack on 11 November brought to an end the long drawn-out Third Battle of Ypres. The Second Battle of Passchendaele cost the Canadian Corps 15,654 casualties with over 4 000 dead, in 16 days of fighting.

1918

Hundred Days Offensive

Throughout these three final months, the Canadian troops saw action in several areas. The first was near the enemy salient on August 8 where the Canadian Corps (along with the New Zealanders, Australians, French and British) was charged with the task of spearheading the assault on the German forces in Amiens. In the subsequent battle, the morale of the German forces was badly shaken. In Ludendorff's words, the battle of Arras was a "black day for the German army." After their breakthrough at Amiens, the Canadians were shifted back to Arras and given the task of cracking the Hindenburg Line in the Arras area.

Between August 26 and September 2, the Canadian Corps launched multiple attacks near the German front at Canal du Nord. On September 27, 1918, the Canadian Corps broke through the Hindenburg Line by smashing through a dry section of the Canal du Nord. The operation ended in triumph on October 11, 1918, when the Canadian forces drove the Germans out of their main distribution centre in the Battle of Cambrai. The Corps would carry on to swift successes at Denain and Valenciennes and on the final day of the war  marched successfully to Mons

Though incredibly successful, this period was also very costly, as the Canadian Corps suffered 46,000 casualties in the final hundred days of the Great War. The last Canadian to be killed was Private George Lawrence Price, two minutes before the armistice took effect at 11 am. on November 11. He is traditionally recognized as being the last British soldier and second last soldier killed in World War I.

Atlantic campaign

At this point, the governments of the United Kingdom and Canada were planning to significantly expand the RCN, but it was decided that Canadian men would be permitted to enlist in either the Royal Navy or its Canadian counterpart, with many choosing the former.

During the fall of 1914, HMCS Rainbow patrolled the west coast of North America, as far south as Panama, although these patrols became less important following the elimination of the German naval threat in the Pacific with the December 1914 defeat of Admiral Graf Maximilian von Spee's German East Asiatic Squadron off the Falkland Islands.  Many of Rainbows crew were posted to the east coast for the remainder of the war and by 1917 Rainbow was withdrawn from service.

The early part of the war also saw HMCS Niobe actively patrolling off the coast of New York City as part of British blockading forces, but she returned to Halifax permanently in July 1915 when she was declared no longer fit for service and was converted to a depot ship.  She was heavily damaged in the December 1917 Halifax Explosion.

CC-1 and CC-2 spent the first three years of the war patrolling the Pacific; however, the lack of German threat saw them reposted to Halifax in 1917.  With their tender, HMCS Shearwater, they became the first warships to transit the Panama Canal flying the White Ensign (the RCN's service flag).  Arriving in Halifax on 17 October 1917, they were declared unfit for service and never patrolled again, being scrapped in 1920.

In June 1918, the Canadian hospital ship  was deliberately sunk by a U-boat which machine gunned survivors on the water.  In terms of the number of dead, the sinking was  the most significant Canadian naval disaster of the First World War.

On 5 September 1918, the Royal Canadian Naval Air Service (RCNAS) was formed with a main function to carry out anti-submarine operations using flying boat patrol aircraft.  The U.S. Navy's Naval Air Station Halifax, located on the eastern shores of the harbour at Eastern Passage, Nova Scotia, was acquired but following the November 11, 1918 Armistice, the RCNAS was discontinued.

Home Front

Conscription

The underlying tension between French and British Canada exploded during World War I. Prior to the war, the French Canadians did not see themselves obliged to serve the British interests. The issue reached its zenith when Canadian Prime Minister Robert Borden introduced the Canadian Military Service Act of 1917. Although some farmers and factory workers opposed the legislation, it was in Quebec, where conscription was most vociferously denounced. Leading the campaign against conscription was Quebec nationalist Henri Bourassa and Sir Wilfrid Laurier who argued that the war pitted Canadians against each other. In the subsequent election, Robert Borden was able to convince enough English-speaking Liberals to vote for his party. In the Canadian Federal Election of 1917, the Union government won 153 seats, nearly all from English Canada. The Liberals won 82 seats. Although the Union government won a large majority of seats, the Union government won only 3 seats in Quebec.

Of the 120,000 conscripts raised in the war, only 47,000 were actually sent overseas. Despite this, the rift between French- and English-speaking Canadians was indelible and would last for many years to come.

Indian nationalists

Indian nationalists grouped around the Ghadar Party had been active in Canada for some time. Following the Komagata Maru incident, when , a ship chartered by Indian immigrants and nationalists was turned around by Canadian authorities. Upon returning to India 19 passengers were killed by British and Indian troops in Calcutta on September 27, 1914 in a major riot, some using smuggled American guns. Prior to the departure of Komagata Maru, in mid-July local Ghadarite, Mewa Singh, was arrested while re-entering Canada from Sumas, Washington, attempting to bring weapons into Canada. The British policeman W. C. Hopkinson had infiltrated the Ghadarites and helped to secure his release with a minor fine. Following the murder of two of Hopkinson's informants in the Ghadarite movement, Bela Singh, was put on trial in Vancouver. On October 21, 1914, while Hopkinson was waiting outside a courtroom, he was assassinated by Mewa Singh.

Saboteurs
From the start of the war, the Canadian government investigated many rumors of a large German attack across the Canada–United States border. While most of the rumors were false, Germany did consider several plans to damage Britain by attacking Canada from the United States. One proposal intended to use 100,000 German military reservists allegedly living in North America, who would join 250,000 German Americans and 300,000 anti-British Irish Americans. To maintain secrecy, the army of 650,000 would dress as cowboys; the foreign office's lawyers ruled that a cowboy costume would not be considered a military uniform under international law. Amazingly, the German government did not reject the proposal because of the impracticality, but because it did not wish to damage relations with the United States by violating American neutrality.

Taken more seriously was the proposal to sabotage trains carrying Japanese troops which, the German General Staff and foreign office were convinced, would soon arrive in France through Canada. Despite German Ambassador to the United States Johann Heinrich von Bernstorff's disbelief in Japan sending troops to the Western Front, foreign office undersecretary Arthur Zimmermann ordered him to prepare with the embassy's military attaché Franz von Papen plans to attack the Canadian Pacific Railway. Von Papen identified several bridges and tunnels in western Canada as targets, but was advised to wait until the Japanese appeared. His agent, a Captain Böhm, recruited 10 people to enter Canada from Maine and blow up five eastern bridges, but cancelled the mission after only three appeared at the rendezvous point and agreed to the plan.

One who did not appear, Werner Horn, thus did not know that the mission was cancelled. In the Vanceboro international bridge bombing, Horn exploded some dynamite but failed to greatly damage the bridge. Von Papen next formed groups of German reservists in several American cities to attack Canadian bridges and, if the Japanese took the Panama Canal, its locks. The saboteurs did not have uniforms, however, and the general staff told the foreign office on 11 February 1915 that wearing cockades and armbands would not protect them from being shot as francs-tireurs. This news discouraged the volunteers and ended the mission. The German government continued to create such plans, however, resulting in the Zimmermann Telegram.

Women

During the First World War Canadian women took part in the war in a variety of ways, including home from factory work, fundraising and serving as nurses overseas.  These women had a large impact on the war effort both from home and on the front lines. Others worked to support soldiers. They volunteered to knit sock, roll bandages, and wrap food parcels for the troops. Women put on variety shows and used the money to buy supplies that were needed overseas. The shortage of men made it necessary for women to work outside the home. They often took jobs that were known as men's work. They worked in banks, insurance firms, civil service, and as gas jockeys, street-car conductors and fish cannery workers. Even though they performed the same jobs as men, they were paid less. When prime minister Robert Borden ordered compulsory military service in May 1917, many women were called upon to run farms, build aircraft and ships, and work in munitions factories. By the end of the war they had earned the right to vote, and were gaining independence in society.

Influence on Canada

National identity

The impact of the First World War on the evolution of Canada's identity is debated by historians. There is general agreement that in the early twentieth century, most English-speaking Canadians saw no conflict between their identity as British subjects and their identities as Canadians. In fact, the British World or British Empire identity was a key part of the Canadian identity. Many Canadians defined their country as the part of North America that owed allegiance to the British Crown. Historian Carl Berger showed that there were relatively few dissenters from this view in English-speaking Canada. In 1914, most English-speaking Canadians had a hybrid imperial-national identity.

Other historians add that Canadian nationalism and belief in independence from the British Empire was strongest in French Canada, whereas imperialism was strongest in English-speaking Canada. These historians focus on Henri Bourassa, who resigned from Wilfrid Laurier’s cabinet to protest the decision to send Canadian troops to fight in the South African War. Bourassa’s resignation is widely regarded as involving a clash between imperialism and Canadian nationalism.

Some historians suggest that Canada was already beginning to move toward greater autonomy from Britain well before 1914. They note that Canada’s government established a Department of External Affairs, or de facto foreign ministry, in 1909. However, these historians also stress that the Department worked closely with British diplomats. Historian Oscar Skelton noted that Alexander Galt, a Canadian government official, negotiated treaties with foreign countries such as Spain and France in the 1880s with only the token participation of British diplomats. These negotiations were precedents followed by Canadian diplomats after 1919, when Canada began to conduct its foreign relations without the involvement of British officials. In other words, Canada's gradual move towards independence was already underway before 1914, although this process may have been accelerated by World War I.

While there is a consensus that on the eve of World War I, most White English-speaking Canadians had a hybrid imperial-national identity, the effects of the war on Canada's emergence as a nation are contested. The Canadian media often refer to World War I and, in particular, the Battle of Vimy Ridge, as marking "the birth of a nation." Some historians consider the First World War to be Canada's "war of independence" and the most important event in Canadian history, ahead of World War II and comparable in effect to the American Civil War on the United States. They argue that the war reduced the extent to which Canadians identified with the British Empire and intensified their sense of being Canadians first and British subjects second. These historians posit two possible mechanisms whereby World War I intensified Canadian nationalism, that pride in Canada's accomplishments on the battlefield promoted Canadian patriotism; and that the war distanced Canada from Britain in that Canadians reacted to the sheer slaughter on the Western Front by adopting an increasingly anti-British attitude.
 
Other historians robustly dispute the view that World War I undermined the hybrid imperial-national identity of English-speaking Canada. Phillip Buckner writes that: "The First World War shook but did not destroy this Britannic vision of Canada. It is a myth that Canadians emerged from the war alienated from, and disillusioned with, the imperial connection." He argues that most English-speaking Canadians  "continued to believe that Canada was, and should continue to be, a "British" nation and that it should cooperate with the other members of the British family in the British Commonwealth of Nations." Historian Pat Brennan has shown that the war strengthened Canadian officers' British identity as well as their Canadian identity.

Still other historians point out that the war’s impact on Canadians’ perception of their place in the world was limited by the simple fact that so many of the Canadian Expeditionary Force soldiers were British-born rather than Canadians. Geoffrey Hayes, Andrew Iarocci, and Mike Bechthold point out that about half of the CEF members who fought at the famous battle of Vimy Ridge were British immigrants.  Moreover, their victory at the ridge involved close cooperation with artillery and other units recruited in the British Isles. 70 percent of the men who enlisted in the CEF were British immigrants, even though British immigrants were just 11 percent of Canada's population. Anglo-Saxon Canadians whose ancestors had lived in North America for generations had low enlistment rates similar to those seen in French Canadian communities.

Historian José Igartua argues that the hybrid imperialist-nationalist identity in English Canada collapsed in the 1950s and 1960s, not during or immediately after the First World War. It was in this period that Canada adopted its current flag and began to oppose Britain on substantive foreign policy issues, as it did in the 1956 Suez Crisis. Historian C.P. Champion argues that Canada's Britishness was not eliminated in the 1960s but survives to the present day in more subtle forms. He cites the new flag, whose red and white echo the colours of England and Kingston's Royal Military College.

Art and literature
"In Flanders Fields" by Canadian Expeditionary Force member John McCrae may be the best-known poem among Canadians. Written after the Second Battle of Ypres, it and the remembrance poppy it inspired have become symbols of Remembrance Day throughout the Commonwealth.
Rilla of Ingleside (1921), the next-to-last book in Lucy Maud Montgomery's Anne of Green Gables series, uses the war as a backdrop.  The book chronicles the experiences of Anne and her family at home in Canada in the war while waiting for the return of Anne's three sons, all of whom are fighting overseas. The book is the only contemporary novel about the war from the perspective of Canadian women.

See also

Canadian pipers in World War I
Canadian war memorials
List of Canadian battles during World War I
List of Canadian soldiers executed during World War I
List of Canadian Victoria Cross recipients
History of the Royal Canadian Navy
 History of Canadian foreign relations

References

Official bibliography
National Defence and the Canadian Forces

Brereton Greenhous; Stephen J. Harris (1992) Canada And The Battle Of Vimy Ridge, 9–12 April 1917 Minister Supply and Service (Downloadable PDF)  
Duguid, A.F, (1938) Official History of the Canadian Forces in the Great War, 1914–1919, Vol I Part I King's Printer, Ottawa, (Downloadable PDF)
Duguid, A.F, (1938) Official History of the Canadian Forces in the Great War, 1914–1919, Vol I Part 2 King's Printer, Ottawa, (Downloadable PDF)
Nicholson, G.W.L. (1964) Official History of the Canadian Army in the First World War: Canadian Expeditionary Force, 1914–1919, Duhamel, Queen's Printer and Controller of Stationery, Ottawa (Downloadable PDF)
Macphail, Sir Andrew (1925) Official History of the Canadian Forces in the Great War: The Medical Services, F.A. Acland, King's Printer, Ottawa  (Downloadable PDF)
Ministry of Overseas Military Forces (1919) Report of the Ministry Overseas Military Forces of Canada – 1918, London : H.M. Stationery Office (Downloadable PDF)
Snell, A.E. (1924) The C.A.M.C. with the Canadian Corps during the Last Hundred Days of the Great War, F.A. Acland, King's Printer, Ottawa (Downloadable PDF)

Further reading

 

Busch, Briton Cooper (2003), Canada and the Great War: Western Front Association papers,  McGill-Queen's University Press 
 Cassar, George H (2010), Hell in Flanders Fields: Canadians at the Second Battle of Ypres, Dundurn Press 
 
 

 Granatstein, J. L. (2004),  Hell's corner : an illustrated history of Canada's Great War, 1914–1918,  Douglas & McIntyre 
 
 Kordan, Bohdan S. (2002), Enemy aliens, prisoners of war: internment in Canada during the Great War, McGill-Queen's University Press 
 Morton, D. (1993).  When Your Number's Up – WWI, Random House of Canada. 
 Turner, Alexander (2005), Vimy Ridge 1917: Byng's Canadians Triumph at Arras Osprey Publ

Historiography
 Shoebottom, Brad. "The First World War and the Homefront in Canada: Broadening the Analysis." Acadiensis: Journal of the History of the Atlantic Region/Revue d'histoire de la region atlantique 50.1 (2021): 149-163.

External links

 First World War at the Dictionary of Canadian Biography
 J. L. Granatstein: Canada, in: 1914-1918-online. International Encyclopedia of the First World War.
 Oliver, Dean F.: Warfare 1914-1918 (Canada) , in: 1914-1918-online. International Encyclopedia of the First World War.
Wood, James A.: Pre-war Military Planning (Canada) , in: 1914-1918-online. International Encyclopedia of the First World War.
 Iarocci, Andrew: Science and Technology (Canada) , in: 1914-1918-online. International Encyclopedia of the First World War.
Sharpe, Christopher: Recruitment and Conscription (Canada) , in: 1914-1918-online. International Encyclopedia of the First World War.
 Cook, Tim, Stewart, William: War Losses (Canada) , in: 1914-1918-online. International Encyclopedia of the First World War.
 Marti, Steve: Dominions’ Military Relationship to Great Britain 1902-1914 (British Dominions) , in: 1914-1918-online. International Encyclopedia of the First World War.
 Canada and the First World War: 1914–1918 at Library and Archives Canada
  A City Goes to War – Canadian Cities during the Great War.  This University of Victoria site currently includes data on Victoria BC.
 Canada and WWI – Canada and World War I.
 
 Percy Carruthers Band fonds RG 562 Brock University Library Digital Repository
 Resources Related to World War I at the Archives of Ontario
 Montreal At War - A History of Montreal During the First World War

 
.
Canada in the World Wars and Interwar Years
World War 01
Canadian Militia